The ampere or amp (symbol A) is the base unit of electric current in the International System of Units.

Ampere or Ampère may also refer to:

People
 André-Marie Ampère (1775–1836), physicist, mathematician and namesake of the ampere unit
 Jean-Jacques Ampère (1800–1864), French philologist

Places
 Ampére, a town in Paraná state, Brasil
 Aïn Azel, a commune in Algeria, former name Ampère
 Collège-lycée Ampère, a school in Lyon, France
 Place Ampère, a square in Lyon, France
Ampère Seamount, a Seamount in the Atlantic Ocean 600km from Gibraltar

Transportation
 Ampère (car), a French automobile, built 1906–1909
 Ampere station, a former rail station in East Orange, New Jersey, US
 , a patrol craft of the US Navy
 , the world's first battery electric ferry

Other uses
 Ampere (microarchitecture), a microarchitecture used in Nvidia GPUs
 Ampère Prize, a French scientific prize awarded annually in honor of André-Marie Ampère
 Ampere (band), an American punk band known for short and extremely loud performances
 Ampere Computing, an American semiconductor company

See also

 Ampere balance, an electromechanical apparatus for precise measurement of the ampere
 Ampère's circuital law, a rule relating the current in a conductor to the magnetic field around it
 Ampère's force law, the force of attraction or repulsion between two current-carrying wires
 Monge–Ampère equation, a type of nonlinear second order partial differential equation
 AMPERS, the Association of Minnesota Public Educational Radio Stations
 
 
 
 Ampera (disambiguation)
 Amped (disambiguation)
 AMPS (disambiguation)
 Amp (disambiguation)